Åssiden Upper Secondary School is a vocational upper secondary school located in the Åssiden area of Drammen, Norway.

Of the ten vocational programs available in Norway, eight of these can be studied at Åssiden. In addition, there is an adult education department, and a department catering to pupils who have recently moved to Norway and who require additional Norwegian language tuition in order to meet the requirements of an upper secondary education.

References

External links
 The official web page of Åssiden Upper Secondary School

Secondary schools in Norway
Drammen